Cricket in Germany has a history going back to 1858, when a group of people from England and the United States founded the first German cricket club in Berlin. Several more teams were later founded in Berlin and the rest of Germany, as well as a national federation. Cricket lingered on over the following century, with occasional visits of German players to England and British and other foreign teams touring in Germany, but only when it got a foothold in the German universities in the 1980s did the number of German cricket clubs and players start to grow again.

Until recently, much of the cricket was played by British soldiers stationed in Germany. However, in recent years the popularity of the game has increased due to an influx of migrants and refugees from cricket-playing countries like Afghanistan and Pakistan.

The national organisation for the game is currently the German Cricket Federation (Deutscher Cricket Bund, DCB), founded in 1988. In 2016 there are about 220 cricket teams in the country, up from 70 in 2012. By 2019, the number of teams had increased to 350.

International team
Germany has a national team that takes part in the European Championship and has also taken part in the ICC Trophy.

Regional associations
German Cricket is organized in several regions, which all have their own leagues. The winner of those will play for the national championship.

Those regional associations are:
Bayrischer Cricket Verband (Bavaria)
Cricket in and around Munich
Cricket Club of Bayern Munich
Lufthansa Services Cricket Club
Munich Cricket Club
Munich International Cricket Club
Pak Orient Cricket Club
Erlangen Cricket Club.e.V.
Serendib Sports Club

Other clubs include:
 Cricket Club Passau e.V.

Berliner Cricket Verband
Berliner Cricket Committee

Ostdeutscher Cricket Verband (ODCV)
Bundesliga Ost:
BFC Viktoria 1889*
Rugby Cricket Dresden
Britannia 92*
Berlin Cricket Club*
Der Sports and Social Club zu Berlin und Brandenburg (DSSC)*
Reinickendorfer Füchse (RFCC)*
Havelländischer Cricket Club Werder (HCCW)
USG Chemnitz e.V. Abt. Cricket Club (USG CCC)

Verbandsliga Ost:
 Bangladesh CC Berlin*
BFC Viktoria 1889*
Rugby Cricket Dresden
Britannia 92*
Berlin Cricket Club*
 Reinickendorfer Füchse (RFCC)*
Havelländischer Cricket Club Werder (HCCW)
USG Chemnitz e.V. Abt. Cricket Club (USG CCC)
 Bautzen Cricket Club*
 AC Berlin (ACB)*

Britannia, BFC Viktoria 1889, Reinickendorfer Füchse (RFCC), AC Berlin, Dresden, HCCW, Bautzen, USG CCC and Berlin CC field a team in the Verbandsliga too.* field a team in the T20-League

Other teams:
ACCB
Stragglers Cricket Club
PCCB (Pakistan Cricket Club Berlin)

Hessischer Cricket Verband
Cosmopolitan Cricket Club Hassloch e.V.
Darmstadt Cricket Club (TH & FH Darmstadt)
Frankfurt Cricket Club (FCC) e.V.
Ruder- und Cricket-Club Hanau e.V.
FSV Hellas 71 e.V., Abteilung Cricket
Olympia Frankfurt e.V., Abteilung Cricket
Rodgau Cricket Club e.V.
SKG Walldorf e.V., Abteilung Cricket
SV Wiesbaden 1899 e.V., Abteilung Cricket

North German Cricket Federation

HSV-Cricket
Oldenburg
HICC
 THCC Rot-Gelb
Pak Alemi
Buxtehude
Lüneburg Panthers
Fallingbostel CC
Jacobs Universität CC Bremen
Hannover
CC der Universität Göttingen
Schwerin Cricket Club
Kiel Cricket Club

Nordrhein-Westfalen Cricket Union
Köln Cricket Club e.V.
Bonn Cricket Society e.V.
Bonn Royals Cricket Club
ASV Köln - CICC
Cologne Cricket Club
Bonn Cricket Club e.V.
Köln Xtremers Cricket Club
Dusseldorf Blackcaps
Bochum Cricket Club e.V.
Rheindahlen Crusaders CC (based in Mönchengladbach)
Dortmund Cricket Club e.V.
Mülheim a.d. Ruhr Cricket Club e.V.
Deutsche Welle CC
Bonn Veterans CC
Duisburg Cricket Club e.V.
Cologne Challengers
Golden Stars Cricket Club Bonn

Baden Württemberg Cricket Verband
Kaiserslautern University CC
Cricket Lions Karlsruhe CC
Karlsruher CC
 Heidelberg Rohrbach Stallions
TSG-Ketsch
Stallions-TSG Wiesloch CC
Pak Freiburg Cricket Club, Freiburg
Freiburg Nomads CC
Cosmopolitan Cricket Club Mannheim
Stuttgart Cricket Eagles e.V.
TSV Asperg e.V., Cricket Abteilung 
TV. St. Ingbert 1881
Stuttgart Cricket Verein e.V.

Club cricket

A feature of club cricket in Germany is that many clubs experience rapid fluctuation in membership, which is composed largely of expats playing the sport.
Clubs which cannot join a league (mostly due to lack of available members) may still take part in independently arranged friendly matches.

The club's wicket can vary from a grass pitch (grown on the natural soil) to coconut fibre wickets on concrete, flicx® pitches, and do-it-yourself constructions. The size of the field also varies, from a good club size (English standard) to double hockey pitches which the club hires, and unusual fields such as that at Göttingen, which is large, but has a bank that rises up to 4 metres above the level of the square.
Indoor cricket is played in various tournaments throughout the winter, mostly in German 3 field gyms, or in indoor tennis halls, in Twenty20 format.

Leagues
The majority of cricket clubs are organised into six regional leagues. Each region hosts one or two leagues of 6 or 7 clubs. Matches are over 50 overs. In two of the leagues the first and second placed teams meet in play-offs, and
the winner of the play-off is the regional champion. At the end of the regional season, national play-offs are held: the northern league champions (NDCV (North), NRCU (North Rhine Westphalia), BCV (Berlin)) play against each other, and the southern teams (HCV (Hesse), BWCV (Baden Württemberg), BYCV (Bavaria)) do likewise. The overall northern and southern winners then play off for the German Championship. Independent of the regional leagues are 20/20 tournaments which are mostly invitational tournaments initiated by one team.

References

Further reading
 P.G.G. Labouchere, T.A.J. Provis and Peter Hargreaves; foreword by Colin Cowdrey.The Story of Continental Cricket (1969)
 James D. Coldham, James Philip (Editor), German Cricket: A Brief History (1983)
 Dan Waddell, Field of Shadows: The English Cricket Tour of Nazi Germany 1937 (2014)

External links
German Cricket Association
 References to cricket in historic German-language newspapers - The European Library